Estádio Waldomiro Pereira was a multi-use stadium located in Patos de Minas, Brazil. It was used mostly for football matches and hosted the home matches of Esporte Clube Mamoré. The stadium had a maximum capacity of 5,000 people.

In 2006, due to financial problems, Mamoré sold the stadium area for development as a supermarket and did not play any of the state's Championiship in 2007 and 2008. As part of an ambitious project, the club started the construction of a new and larger stadium outside the main part of the city, that would allow Mamoré to come back to professional games in 2009.

External links
Templos do Futebol

Defunct football venues in Brazil
Football venues in Minas Gerais